Adventure Time: Finn & Jake Investigations is a 2015 action adventure video game developed by Vicious Cycle Software under license from Cartoon Network Interactive. It was published by Little Orbit for Microsoft Windows, PlayStation 3, PlayStation 4, Xbox 360, Xbox One, Wii U, and Nintendo 3DS. This is the fourth game based on the animated television series Adventure Time following The Secret of the Nameless Kingdom, and the first action-adventure title in the series presented in full 3D graphics. The game was first announced on April 21, 2015, and released on October 20, 2015, in North America, and on November 6 in Europe. 

The game was removed from digital storefronts on March 31, 2018, due to the expiration of Little Orbit's Adventure Time license.

Overview
Players check out Land of Ooo locales, talk to characters, sharpen their creative puzzle-solving skills, and defeat bad guys. Loosely based on the TV show's sixth season, the game features a focus on exploring, investigating, and puzzle-solving. Thanks to the discovery of an assignment printing machine called the 'tickertype,' Finn and Jake decide to become detectives like their parents, Joshua and Margaret. Players gradually fill the treasure room of Finn and Jake's Tree House with treasure from enemies that they defeat.

Reception

It has a score of 66 on Metacritic. Nintendo Life awarded it a score of 7 out of 10, saying "While it might prove too basic for more advanced players, younger players and families should have a fun time questing with dog and human. Big fans of the show, of course, should not feel so afraid to give this one a try, either." Nintendo World Report awarded it a score of 7 out of 10, saying "By default, I feel as if this is the best Adventure Time video game so far. It's not perfect, and it's a little on the easy side, but as an Adventure Time fan, it made me smile."

References

External links
 

2015 video games
Action-adventure games
Finn and Jake Investigations
Detective video games
Episodic video games
Nintendo 3DS eShop games
Nintendo 3DS games
PlayStation 3 games
PlayStation 4 games
Video games based on television series
Video games developed in the United States
Video games scored by Rod Abernethy
Wii U eShop games
Wii U games
Windows games
Xbox 360 games
Xbox One games
Cartoon Network video games